Attilio Schneck (born 8 July 1946 in Schio) is an Italian Venetist politician. He is member of the Liga Veneta-Lega Nord.

He joined Liga Veneta in the early 1990s and was Mayor of Thiene from 1997 to 2007, when he was elected President of the Province of Vicenza by a landslide: in the election he obtained 60.0% of the vote against 17.2% of his major opponent.

Schneck was the president of A4 Holding.

References

Politicians of Veneto
Venetist politicians
Living people
1946 births
Mayors of places in Veneto
Lega Nord politicians
People from Schio
Presidents of the Province of Vicenza
20th-century Italian politicians
21st-century Italian politicians